The Dutch-speaking electoral college is one of three constituencies of the European Parliament in Belgium. It currently elects 12 MEPs using the D'Hondt method of party-list proportional representation. Previously it elected 13 MEPS, until the 2013 accession of Croatia. Before that, it elected 14 MEPs, until the 2007 accession of Bulgaria and Romania.

Boundaries 
The constituency generally corresponds to the Flemish Community of Belgium, and is sometimes called the Flemish-speaking electoral college. In officially bilingual Brussels, electors can choose between lists of this electoral college or those of the French-speaking electoral college.

Prior to the 2011–2012 state reform, voters could choose between both lists not only in Brussels, but in an area encompassing unilingually Dutch territory, Brussels-Halle-Vilvoorde; some towns in the officially Dutch-speaking Brussels Periphery still have this option.

Members of the European Parliament

2009 – 2014 
 Ivo Belet, CD&V
 Frieda Brepoels / Mark Demesmaeker, N-VA
 Philip Claeys, VB
 Philippe De Backer, Open Vld
 Jean-Luc Dehaene, CD&V
 Saïd El Khadraoui, Sp.a
 Derk-Jan Eppink, LDD
 Annemie Neyts-Uyttebroeck, Open Vld
 Bart Staes, Groen!
 Marianne Thyssen, CD&V
 Kathleen Van Brempt, Sp.a
 Frank Vanhecke, independent
 Guy Verhofstadt, Open Vld

2004 – 2009 
 Ivo Belet, CD&V/N-VA
 Frederika Brepoels, CD&V/N-VA
 Philip Claeys, Vlaams Blok
 Jean-Luc Dehaene, CD&V/N-VA
 Karel De Gucht, VLD/Vivant
 Mia De Vits, SPA/Spirit
 Koenraad Dillen, Vlaams Blok
 Saïd El Khadraoui, SPA/Spirit
 Annemie Neyts, VLD/Vivant
 Bart Staes, Groen!
 Dirk Sterckx, VLD/Vivant
 Marianne Thyssen, CD&V/N-VA
 Frank Vanhecke, Vlaams Blok
 Anne Van Lancker, SPA/Spirit

Election results

2014

2009

2004

1999

1994

1989

1984

1979

Returned members 
Below are all members since the creation of the Dutch-speaking electoral college. Only members who were sworn in at the beginning of each parliamentary turn are mentioned. Under Belgian law, MEPs can resign and be automatically replaced. This was the case, for example, for Johan Van Overtveldt, who resigned to become Minister of Finance on 14 October 2014 and was replaced by Sander Loones.

References

European Parliament constituencies in Belgium
1979 establishments in Belgium
Constituencies established in 1979
Electoral colleges